Gambaga Witch camp is a segregated community within Gambaga township in the North East Region of Ghana established as a shelter to accommodate alleged witches and wizards who are banished from their communities.

The camp has about 25 round huts, and holds about 100 inmates. No health services or indoor plumbing are available.

Many women in Ghana's witch camps are widows and it is thought that relatives accused them of witchcraft. Other inmates in the camp have been accused of using black magic to cause misfortunes in their community. Many women also are mentally ill, a little understood problem in Ghana. In Gambaga, the women are given protection by the local chieftain.

Responses 
The Brong Ahafo regional youth organiser of the New Patriotic Party, Kwame Baffoe has likened those who do not understand the party's controversial free SHS education policy to witches who should be sent to the Gambaga witch camp to understand the practicality of the policy.

The former first lady of Ghana, Lordina Mahama, donated assorted items to the alleged witches in the camp for their upkeep during her tour to the northern sector of the country.

Yaba Badoe made a documentary film, The Witches of Gambaga about the alleged witches.

See also
 Kayayei
 Witch camp
 Witchcraft accusations against children in Africa

References

External links
 Video by Yaba Badoe about women in Ghanaian camps
Dispatches Saving Africa's Witch Children
Witch Child Documentary

Populated places in the Northern Region (Ghana)
Women in Ghana
African witchcraft
Refugee camps in Africa
Violence against women in Ghana